Lachlan Goudie (born 1976) is a Scottish artist and television presenter.

Early life
Lachlan Goudie was born in Glasgow, Scotland, in 1976, the son of Scottish figurative painter Alexander Goudie. He was educated at the Kelvinside Academy, after which he studied English Literature at Cambridge University. Following this, he was awarded the Levy-Plumb scholarship of a year's painting residency at Christ's College, Cambridge.

Career
Goudie was awarded the R. S. P. Prize for painting at the Royal Glasgow Institute of the Fine Arts in 1999, and the N. S. MacFarlane Prize at the Royal Scottish Academy in 2001. He studied at the Camberwell College of Arts and is a member of the Royal Institute of Oil Painters.

He has presented the television programmes Secret Knowledge: The Art of Witchcraft (2013) and Stanley Spencer: The Colours of Clyde (2014), both on BBC Four. In 2017 he was a judge on the BBC's The Big Painting Challenge. In 2017 he was commissioned to document the construction of new aircraft carriers for the Royal Navy.

In 2015 he wrote and presented the four-part BBC series The Story of Scottish Art.

Selected solo exhibitions
1999: "From Cambridge to Rajasthan", Christ's College, Cambridge
2001: "A London Eye", Gallery Q2, London
2006: "Showreel", The Cremer Street Gallery, London
2008: "New paintings from the South of France", Thompson's Gallery
2009: "Dreaming Places", The Elizabeth Harris Gallery, New York
2010: "Of the Moment", Roger Billcliffe Gallery, Glasgow
2011: "A True Wilderness Heart", The Elizabeth Harris Gallery, New York

References

External links 
http://lachlangoudie.com/

1976 births
Living people
21st-century Scottish male artists
Alumni of Camberwell College of Arts
Alumni of Christ's College, Cambridge
Artists from Glasgow
People educated at Kelvinside Academy
Scottish male painters